The  Compton Gap Site is an archaeological site on the National Register of Historic Places near Luray, Virginia.  It is located in Shenandoah National Park.

References

Archaeological sites on the National Register of Historic Places in Virginia
National Register of Historic Places in Warren County, Virginia
National Register of Historic Places in Shenandoah National Park